Butlers Island is an island in Delta County, Michigan. The island is located inside the bay of Little Bay de Noc in Lake Michigan. The island is uninhabited.

References

Islands of Delta County, Michigan
Uninhabited islands of Michigan
Islands of Lake Michigan in Michigan